The South Plains is a region in northwest Texas, consisting of 24 counties. The main crop is cotton.

Counties
The South Plains region includes 24 counties:

The northernmost four (Parmer, Castro, Swisher, and Briscoe) are also considered to be part of the Texas Panhandle region.

The region consists of a portion of the Texas side of the geographical Llano Estacado and the western portion of the lower part of the Southwestern Tablelands ecological region.  South Plains extends south of the Texas Panhandle, centered at Lubbock. While prominent in the area of petroleum production, the South Plains is mainly an agricultural region, producing a great percentage of the nation's cotton and possessing numerous large cattle ranches. The South Plains is also home to several colleges and universities, the largest being Texas Tech University in Lubbock.

Major cities and towns

Cotton
Cotton is the most common crop grown in South Plains region.  In 2004 and again in 2005, records were broken for cotton production.  In an extended area comprising 31 counties in and near the South Plains, more than a million bales of cotton were harvested in 2005.  This makes the South Plains the world’s largest cotton-producing region.

Regional identity
There are many businesses and organizations that use “South Plains” as part of their name, helping to form the South Plains regional identity.  These include South Plains College in Levelland; the Panhandle-South Plains Fair held annually in Lubbock; the South Plains Regional Chapter of the American Red Cross; South Plains Council of the Boy Scouts of America; and numerous other public and private organizations.

See also
List of geographical regions in Texas
Llano Estacado
South Plains Fairgrounds
Southwestern Tablelands ecology region
Western High Plains ecology region
Great Plains
Texas Panhandle
Eastern New Mexico
Caprock Escarpment

References

External links
South Plains Fair
South Plains Regional Chapter, American Red Cross
South Plains Council

Catholic Charities, Diocese of Lubbock

Regions of Texas
Great Plains
Plains of the United States
Geography of Lubbock, Texas